The Ukrainian Journal of Physics, is a peer-reviewed scientific journal covering the field of experimental and theoretical physics, including field theory and the theory of elementary particles, nuclear physics, plasma physics, atomic physics, molecular physics, condensed matter physics, optics, radiophysics, and electronics. The journal was established in 1956  (Ukrainian and Russian editions) and until 1994 was published by Naukova Dumka. Beginning from 1994, the journal has been published by the Bogolyubov Institute for Theoretical Physics, National Academy of Sciences of Ukraine. Since 2004, the journal has an English edition. It is recognized by the Higher Attestation Commission of Ukraine. The editor-in-chief is Anatoliy Zahorodniy (Bogolyubov Institute for Theoretical Physics, National Academy of Sciences of Ukraine).

References

External links 
 

1956 establishments in Ukraine
Science and technology in Ukraine
Physics journals
Publications established in 1956
English-language journals
Monthly journals